Patrik Ervell is an American-born menswear designer based in New York City.  Ervell is a graduate of University of California, Berkeley where he studied political science, economics and art history.

Career
Ervell is known for his understated and intellectual approach to menswear. His designs are characterized as utilitarian, minimal and elegant. His collections featuring innovative materials, military details and futurist references have earned him a cult following.  He is seen as one of the more significant menswear designers to emerge from New York in the early 21st century.

Ervell is noted for using innovative and unusual fabrics including gold foil, vintage parachutes, fabrics dyed with oxidized iron and copper, handmade rubber raincoats, horsehair, and splash-dyed silks.  He also had an ongoing collaboration with interior design fabricators Maharam.

His aesthetic has been described as Swedish understatement and practicality meets American sportswear peppered with the romantic futurism of science fiction.

Patrik Ervell debuted in 2005 at the New York City concept store Opening Ceremony.  Upon winning the Ecco Domani Award for Menswear in 2007 he debuted his collection in his first runway show. Since then, Patrik has received nominations for the CFDA's Swarovski Award for Menswear in 2008, 2009 and 2010. Ervell was the runner up for the CFDA/Vogue Fashion Fund Award in 2009. In 2011 he was nominated for GQ's Best New Menswear Designer in America, and the CFDA Menswear Designer of the Year. Ervell showed his menswear collections twice yearly at New York Fashion Week, showing in both presentation and runway show formats. After seasons of presentations, for his Fall Winter 2012 collection Ervell returned to the runway presentation.

Ervell launched his online store in 2010, www.patrikervell.com. Patrik Ervell was carried around the world at stores such as Barneys and Opening Ceremony.

In 2017, Ervell closed his eponymous label and joined Los Angeles based Vince as its Mens Creative Director.

References

External links 
 Official Website
 GQ.com 10 Essentials: Patrik Ervell
 Patrik Ervell Collection on Style.com

Living people
American fashion designers
University of California, Berkeley alumni
Menswear designers
Year of birth missing (living people)